The 161st Street station was a local station on the demolished IRT Third Avenue Line in the Bronx, New York City. It was originally opened on August 7, 1887 by the Suburban Rapid Transit Company, and had three tracks and two side platforms. The next stop to the north was 166th Street. It was the northernmost station on the Third Avenue elevated until Christmas Day that year. The next stop to the south was 156th Street. The station closed on April 29, 1973.

The train was notable at this station for arriving in front of the Bronx Borough Courthouse.

References

External links 

IRT Third Avenue Line stations
Former elevated and subway stations in the Bronx
Railway stations in the United States opened in 1887
Railway stations closed in 1973
1887 establishments in New York (state)
1973 disestablishments in New York (state)
Morrisania, Bronx
Third Avenue